Eve Oja (10 October 1948 – 27 January 2019) was an Estonian mathematician specializing in functional analysis. She was a professor at the University of Tartu.

Early life and education
Oja was born in Tallinn and studied at the Tartu State University (now the University of Tartu), completing her undergraduate studies in 1972 and earning a doctorate (Cand.Sc.) in 1975. Her dissertation, Безусловные шаудеровы разложения в локально выпуклых пространствах (Unconditional Schauder decompositions in locally convex spaces) was supervised by Gunnar Kangro.

Career
Oja was on the faculty of the University of Tartu since 1975, with a year (1977-78) teaching in Mali, and another (1980-81) doing postdoctoral research at Aix-Marseille University in France. She served several terms as head of the Institute of Pure Mathematics at the university, and from 2009-15 she headed the Estonian School of Mathematics and Statistics.

She was editor-in-chief of the mathematics journal Acta et Commentationes Universitatis Tartuensis de Mathematica since 1998.

Recognition
Oja was elected to the Estonian Academy of Sciences in 2010. She was also a member of the European Academy of Sciences and Arts.

Death
Oja died on 27 January 2019.

References

1948 births
2019 deaths
Estonian mathematicians
Women mathematicians
Functional analysts
University of Tartu alumni
Academic staff of the University of Tartu
Members of the European Academy of Sciences and Arts
People from Tallinn